The women's shot put event at the 1990 World Junior Championships in Athletics was held in Plovdiv, Bulgaria, at Deveti Septemvri Stadium on 8 and 9 August.

Medalists

Results

Final
9 August

Qualifications
8 Aug

Group A

Participation
According to an unofficial count, 18 athletes from 11 countries participated in the event.

References

Shot put
Shot put at the World Athletics U20 Championships